Neil David Burns (born 19 September 1965) is a former English cricketer who played as a wicketkeeper/batsman at First-class and List A level for various clubs but spent the majority of his career at Leicestershire and Somerset.

Burns was born in Chelmsford, Essex in 1965.

In 2004, following the end of his playing career, Burns re-formed the London County Cricket Club which had been founded by W.G. Grace - which he continues to manage.

References

1965 births
Living people
English cricketers
Leicestershire cricketers
Essex cricketers
Somerset cricketers
Buckinghamshire cricketers
Sportspeople from Chelmsford
Marylebone Cricket Club cricketers
Wicket-keepers